KUSW (88.1 FM) is a non-commercial radio station licensed to Flora Vista, New Mexico, United States. KUSW is owned by KUTE, Inc., and serves the Four Corners area.

This public radio station broadcasts an adult album alternative music format as part of the Four Corners Public Radio and Southern Ute Tribal Radio networks. As such, a portion of its programming is a simulcast of sister station KSUT in Ignacio, Colorado. KUSW is a member station of both National Public Radio and the AIROS Native Radio Network.

Due to its location at the bottom of the FM band (88.1 MHz) and transmitter's close proximity (72 km) to the other station, this station causes a small but legally permissible amount of interference with the analog channel 6 signal (87.75 MHz) of KREZ-TV, a television station licensed to Durango, Colorado. To minimize the interference, KUSW broadcasts with only a vertical polarization.

History
After a nearly five-year application process, this station was granted its original construction permit by the Federal Communications Commission on February 3, 2005.  In April 2006, permit holders Native American Christian Voice reached an agreement to transfer the permit to KUTE, Inc. The transfer was approved by the FCC on May 31, 2006, and the transaction was consummated on June 7, 2006.

The new station was assigned the call letters KUUT on June 21, 2006.  On March 22, 2007, the station changed its call sign to the current KUSW. KUSW received its license to cover on February 8, 2008.

The KUSW call sign was formerly used by a commercial shortwave radio station in Murray, Utah, which at one point was under the same ownership as KRSP-FM and the former KKDS (now known as KWDZ).

In August 2006, the station, then still under construction, received an $85,000 grant from the Corporation for Public Broadcasting for the purchase of equipment needed to make the transition from analog to digital transmission. In September 2007, KUSW received an additional grant from the Corporation for Public Broadcasting to assist in its conversion from analog to digital broadcasting. KUSW was the only radio station in New Mexico to receive such a grant in 2007.

References

External links

USW
Adult album alternative radio stations in the United States
NPR member stations
Radio stations established in 2008
San Juan County, New Mexico